The Story of Good Will is a 1959 Australian TV play. It was a pantomime produced for Christmas Eve and was Australia's first television pantomime.

The same night the ABC broadcast a nativity play The House by the Stable.

Plot
In the land of Christmas Country, the King has banned Merry Christmasses. Good Will, the only man who knows how to make Merry Christmasses, has disappeared, s Princess Merry asks Jan the Gardener (a Prince in disguise) to help find him.

Cast
Robyn Hosking as the Queen
Brian Fitzsimmons as the King
Barbara Frawley as the Princess
Earle Cross as Jan the Gardner
John Tasker as don't-ask-me
Reg Quartly as dragon

Production
It was filmed at the ABC's studios in Gore Hill and featured stars of the ABC TV's Children's Club. The pantomime had been written two years earlier.

References

Australian drama television films
Australian television plays
1959 television films
1959 drama films
1959 films